Miroslav Ivanišević (born 1956 in Cetinje) is a Montenegrin politician. He was appointed as the Montenegrin Minister of Finance in July 1998, and served until February 2004. He has a degree from economics.

In 2007 he was accused of being involved in cigarette smuggling into Italy, but was found not guilty in 2010.

References

1956 births
Living people
Deputy Prime Ministers of Montenegro
Finance ministers of Montenegro
Government ministers of Montenegro